Zarah Leander (15 March 1907 – 23 June 1981) was a Swedish singer and actress whose greatest success was in Germany between 1936 and 1943, when she was contracted to work for the state-owned Universum Film AG  (UFA). Although no exact record sales numbers exist, she was probably among Europe's best-selling recording artists in the years prior to 1945. Her involvement with UFA caused her films and lyrics to be identified as Nazi propaganda. Though she had taken no public political position and was dubbed an "Enemy of Germany" by Joseph Goebbels, she remained a controversial figure for the rest of her life. As a singer Leander was known for her confident style and her dark, veiled voice (contralto or male baritone).

Early career
She was born as Sara Stina Hedberg in Karlstad, studying piano and violin as a child, and sang on stage for the first time at the age of six.  She initially had no intention of becoming a professional performer and led an ordinary life for several years. As a teenager she lived two years in Riga, Latvia (1922–1924), where she learned German, took up work as a secretary, married Nils Leander (1926), and had two children (1927 and 1929). However, in 1929 she was engaged, as an amateur, in a touring cabaret by the entertainer and producer Ernst Rolf and for the first time sang "Vill ni se en stjärna" ("Do You Want to See a Star?"), which soon would become her signature tune.

In 1930, she participated in four cabarets in the capital, Stockholm, made her first records, including a cover of Marlene Dietrich's "Falling in Love Again", and played a part in a film. However, it was as "Hanna Glavari" in Franz Lehár's operetta The Merry Widow that she had her definitive break-through (1931). By then she had divorced Nils Leander. In the following years, she expanded upon her career and made a living as an artist on stage and in film in Scandinavia. Her fame brought her proposals from the European continent and from Hollywood, where a number of Swedish actors and directors were working.

In the beginning of the 1930s she performed with the Swedish revue artist, producer, and songwriter Karl Gerhard who was a prominent anti-Nazi. He wrote a song for Zarah Leander, "I skuggan av en stövel" ("In the shadow of a boot"), in 1934 which strongly condemned the persecution of Jews in Nazi Germany.

Leander opted for an international career on the European continent. As a mother of two school-age children, she ruled out a move to America, fearing the consequences of taking the children such a great distance and being unable to find employment. Despite the political situation, Austria and Germany were much closer to home, and Leander was already well-versed in German.

A second breakthrough, by contemporary measures her international debut, was the world premiere (1936) of Axel an der Himmelstür (Axel at the Gate of Heaven) at the Theater an der Wien in Vienna, directed by Max Hansen. It was a parody of Hollywood and not the least a parody of Marlene Dietrich. It was followed by the Austrian film Premiere, in which she played a successful cabaret star.

UFA star

In 1936, she was introduced to Studio Head Ernst Correll by Director Douglas Sirk and landed a contract with UFA in Berlin. She became renowned as a very tough negotiator, demanding both influence and a high salary, half of which was to be paid in Swedish kronor to a bank in Stockholm. Even though Propaganda Minister Joseph Goebbels dubbed her an "Enemy of Germany" for her aforementioned behavior, as a leading film star at UFA, she participated in ten films, most of them great successes. Leander neither socialized with leading party members nor took part in official Nazi Party functions. A likely apocryphal meeting with Goebbels supposedly resulted in this exchange: "Zarah... Isn't that a Jewish name?" "Oh, maybe", the actress said, "but what about Josef?" "Hmmm... yes, yes, a good answer", Goebbels reportedly replied. Involvement with the Nazi propaganda machine did not prevent her from recording in 1938 the Yiddish song "Bei Mir Bistu Shein".

Many of her songs were composed by Michael Jary, with whom she had an affair, and Bruno Balz with music and lyrics, respectively. In her films, Leander repeatedly played independent, beautiful, passionate and self-confident women. Leander scored the two biggest hits of her recording career—in her signature deep voice, she sang her anthems of hope and survival: „Davon geht die Welt nicht unter” ("This is not the end of the world") and "Ich weiss, es wird einmal ein Wunder geschehen" ("I know that someday a miracle will happen"). These two songs in particular are often included in contemporary documentaries as obvious examples of effective Nazi propaganda. Although no exact record sales numbers exist, it is likely that she was among Europe's best-selling recording artists in the years prior to 1945. She pointed out in later years that what made her a fortune was not her salary from UFA, but the royalties from the records she released.

Return to Sweden

Her last film in Nazi Germany premiered on 3 March 1943. Her villa in Grunewald was hit in an air raid, and the increasingly desperate Nazis pressured her to apply for German citizenship. She was still contractually obligated for another film to UFA, but held up the film representatives by rejecting script after script.

Gradually she managed to land engagements on the Swedish stage. After the war she did eventually return to tour Germany and Austria, giving concerts, making new records and acting in musicals. Her comeback found an eager audience among pre-war generations who had never forgotten her. She appeared in a number of films and television shows, but she would never regain the popularity she had enjoyed before and into the first years of World War II. In 1981, after having retired from show business, she died in Stockholm of complications from a stroke.

Controversy
Leander was often questioned about her years in Nazi Germany. Though she would willingly talk about her past, she strongly rejected allegations of her having had sympathy for the Nazi regime. She claimed that her position as a German film actress merely had been that of an entertainer working to please an enthusiastic audience in a difficult time.

On the other hand, in an interview recorded shortly before his death in 1996 the senior Soviet intelligence officer Pavel Sudoplatov claimed that Leander had in fact been a Soviet agent with the codename "Stina-Rose". Recruited by the Soviet Union before the outbreak of war, she was said to have refused payment for her work because she was a secret member of the Swedish Communist Party and therefore conducted the work for political reasons. Leander herself denied any suggestion that she had acted as a spy for any country.

Legacy

Leander continued to be popular in Germany for many decades after World War II. She was interviewed several times on German television before her death. In 1983, New Wave singer Nina Hagen, who had idolized Leander as a child, released the single "Zarah", based on „Ich weiss, es wird einmal ein Wunder geschehen”. In 1987, two Swedish musicals were written about Zarah Leander. In 2003, a bronze statue was placed in Zarah Leander's home town Karlstad, by the Opera house of Värmland where she first began her career. After many years of discussions, the town government accepted this statue on behalf of the local Zarah Leander Society. A Zarah Leander museum is open near her mansion outside Norrköping. Every year a scholarship is given to a creative artist in her tradition. The performer  received the prize in 2010, the female impersonator  in 2009, and Zarah's friend and creator of the museum Brigitte Pettersson in 2008.

Filmography
 Dante's Mysteries (1931), with Eric Abrahamson, Elisabeth Frisk, Gustaf Lövås
 The False Millionaire (1931), with Sture Lagerwall, Fridolf Rhudin
 The Marriage Game (1935), with Einar Axelsson, Karl Gerhard, Elsa Carlsson
  Premiere (1937, her first film in German), with Karl Martell, Attila Hörbiger, Theo Lingen
 To New Shores (1937), with Willy Birgel, Viktor Staal, Carola Höhn, Erich Ziegel, Hilde von Stolz
  La Habanera (1937), with Ferdinand Marian, Karl Martell, Paul Bildt, Edwin Juergenssen, Werner Finck
  Heimat (1938), with Heinrich George, Ruth Hellberg, Lina Carstens, Paul Hörbiger, Leo Slezak
  The Blue Fox (1938), with Willy Birgel, Paul Hörbiger, Jane Tilden, Karl Schönböck, Rudolf Platte
  The Life and Loves of Tschaikovsky (1939), with Marika Rökk, Paul Dahlke, Aribert Wäscher
  Das Lied der Wüste (1939), with Gustav Knuth, Friedrich Domin, Herbert Wilk, Franz Schafheitlin
  Das Herz der Königin (1940), with Willy Birgel, Axel von Ambesser, Will Quadflieg, Margot Hielscher
  Der Weg ins Freie (1941), with Hans Stüwe, Agnes Windeck, Siegfried Breuer, Hedwig Wangel
 The Great Love (1942), with Viktor Staal, Paul Hörbiger, Grethe Weiser, Wolfgang Preiss
  Back Then (1943), with Hans Stüwe, Rossano Brazzi, Karl Martell, Hilde Körber, Otto Graf
 Gabriela (1950), with Siegfried Breuer, Carl Raddatz, Grethe Weiser, Gunnar Möller
 Cuba Cabana (1952), with O. W. Fischer, Paul Hartmann, Hans Richter, Eduard Linkers, Karl Meixner, Werner Lieven
  Ave Maria (1953), with Hans Stüwe, Marianne Hold, Hilde Körber, Berta Drews, Carl Wery
 It Was Always So Nice With You (1954), with Willi Forst, Heinz Drache, Sonja Ziemann, Margot Hielscher
 The Blue Moth (1959), with Christian Wolff, Marina Petrowa, Paul Hartmann, Werner Hinz
Das Blaue vom Himmel (1964, TV film), with Karin Baal, Toni Sailer, Carlos Werner
 How I Learned to Love Women (1966), with Nadja Tiller, Anita Ekberg, Romina Power, Robert Hoffmann, Michèle Mercier

Operettas and musicals
 1931: Franz Lehár: Die lustige Witwe
 1936: Ralph Benatzky: Axel an der Himmelstür (as Gloria Mills)
 1958: Ernst Nebhut, Peter Kreuder: Madame Scandaleuse (as Helene)
 1960: Oscar Straus: Eine Frau, die weiß, was sie will (as Manon Cavallini)
 1964: Karl Farkas, Peter Kreuder: Lady aus Paris (as Mrs. Erlynne)
 1968: Peter Thomas, Ika Schafheitlin, Helmuth Gauer: Wodka für die Königin (as Königin Aureliana)
 1975: Stephen Sondheim, Hugh Wheeler: Das Lächeln einer Sommernacht (as Madame Armfeldt)

References

Sources

General literature

Autobiography

Further reading

External links 

 
 Listen to Zarah sing
 Zarah Leander talking about her German film years (in Swedish)
 Photographs and bibliography
 
 Zarah Leander, German fan-site

1907 births
1981 deaths
20th-century Swedish actresses
20th-century Swedish women writers
20th-century non-fiction writers
German-language singers
People from Karlstad
Schlager musicians
Swedish autobiographers
Swedish expatriates in Germany
Swedish film actresses
Swedish musical theatre actresses
Swedish people of World War II
Women autobiographers
20th-century Swedish women singers